Lucanica was a rustic pork sausage in Ancient Roman cuisine.

Apicius documents it as a spicy, smoked beef or pork sausage originally from Lucania; according to Cicero and Martial, it was brought by Roman troops or slaves from Lucania.

It has given its name to a variety of sausages (fresh, cured, and smoked) in Mediterranean cuisine and its colonial offshoots, including:

 Italian luganega or lucanica
 Portuguese and Brazilian linguiça
 Bulgarian lukanka or loukanka
 Macedonian (Western dialects) lukanec/луканец or lukanci/луканци 
 Albanian (Arbëresh community in Italy) likëngë or lekëngë, also llukanik in Albania. 
 Greek loukaniko, a fresh sausage usually flavored with orange peel
 Spanish, Latin American, and Philippine longaniza, a name which covers both fresh and cured sausages
 Arabic laqāniq, naqāniq, or maqāniq, made of mutton and some semolina
Modern Hebrew naqniq (נקניק), an umbrella term for "sausage". 
 Basque lukainka
Croatian luganiga, flavored with cinnamon

Today, lucanica sausage is identified as  Lucanica di Picerno, produced in Basilicata (whose territory was part of the ancient Lucania).

See also

 List of smoked foods

References

Sausages
Roman cuisine
Ancient dishes